Valley Mills High School is a public high school located in Valley Mills, Texas and classified as a 2A school by the UIL. It is part of the Valley Mills Independent School District. In 2015, the school was rated "Met Standard" by the Texas Education Agency.

Athletics
The Valley Mills Eagles compete in these sports - 

Baseball
Basketball
Cross Country
Football
Golf
Tennis
Track and Field
Powerlifting
Softball
Volleyball

State Titles
Baseball - 
1983(1A), 1991(1A), 1992(1A), 2022(2A)

Clubs and groups
The school has many known clubs: Valley Mills Eagle Pride Band, FFA, Fellowship of Christian Athletes, FCCLA, Yearbook, Leo and also a Spanish Club. The football team, under the direction of head coach, Sam Moody, have a good record.  The girls basketball and softball teams are very competitive and have been quite successful in recent years.

The Valley Mills High School Band went to state for the first time in 2017, after coming in first at the Area competition. Once there, they finished second overall in the state of Texas for 2A bands. They returned to state the following year, following another first-place victory at Area, and finished their season as the Texas UIL Class 2A State Marching Champions.

Notable alumni
Donnie Sadler - Major League Baseball player

References

External links
 Valley Mills ISD

Schools in McLennan County, Texas
Public high schools in Texas